Isaac Moses Bakst (died June 18, 1882) was a lecturer at the Jewish Rabbinical College of Zhitomir. He wrote Sefer ha-Ḥinnuḥ (Zhitomir, 1868), a Hebrew textbook for beginners, adapted for Jewish Russian schools. For many years he owned a Hebrew printing-office in Zhitomir.

References
 

1882 deaths
19th-century printers
Jewish educators
Jews from the Russian Empire
People from Zhitomirsky Uyezd
Writers from Zhytomyr
Textbook writers